The UC San Diego Tritons men's basketball program represents the University of California San Diego (UC San Diego) in National Collegiate Athletic Association's Division I level as a member of the Big West Conference.

UC San Diego basketball plays its home games at Liontree Arena in La Jolla. At the end of the 2007–08 season, they won the CCAA tournament and advanced to the first round of the NCAA West Regionals. After a relatively dry spell, the team has seen most of its success in recent years under Eric Olen. In 2015–16, they were the NCAA West Region runners-up. The 2016–17 season was the first in which they won the CCAA regular-season title; they also won the CCAA Tournament and were again NCAA West Region runners-up. The team won the CCAA Tournament again in 2017–18, but dropped in the NCAA West Regional quarterfinals. The Tritons have the most CCAA Tournament titles of any current CCAA member school, with three.

Triton basketball transitioned to NCAA Division I and the Big West Conference in 2020. They will not be eligible to participate in March Madness until the reclassification period ends in 2024.

Postseason results
The Tritons have appeared in six Division II tournaments and four Division III tournaments.

NCAA Division II tournament results

NCAA Division III tournament results

Yearly Records

References